Sochchora dotina is a moth of the family Pterophoridae. It is known from Brazil and Panama.

The wingspan is about 14 mm. Adults are on wing in November.

External links

Pterophorinae
Moths described in 1915
Taxa named by Thomas de Grey, 6th Baron Walsingham
Moths of South America